Aurelio Galli (26 February 1866 – 26 March 1929) was an Italian prelate and Cardinal-Deacon of S. Angelo in Pescheria.

References

1866 births
1929 deaths
People from Frascati
20th-century Italian cardinals
Pontifical Roman Seminary alumni
Cardinals created by Pope Pius XI